Arseniy Kontsedaylov (born 15 July 1997) is a Russian-born Belarusian professional footballer who plays for Dinamo Brest.

References

External links 
 
 

1997 births
Living people
Belarusian footballers
Association football forwards
FC Minsk players
FC Oshmyany players
FC Energetik-BGU Minsk players
FC Sputnik Rechitsa players
FC Slutsk players
FC Dynamo Brest players